|}

The Aintree Hurdle is a Grade 1 National Hunt hurdle race in Great Britain which is open to horses aged four years or older. It is run at Aintree over a distance of about 2 miles and 4 furlongs, and during its running there are eleven hurdles to be jumped. The race is scheduled to take place each year in early April.

The event was established in 1976, and it was originally run over 2 miles and 5½ furlongs. It was shortened to its present length in 1988. The race is staged during the three-day Grand National meeting, and was traditionally contested on the final day, Saturday. In 2013 it was moved to the opening day of the meeting, Thursday.

The Aintree Hurdle often features horses which ran previously over a shorter distance in the Champion Hurdle, and the last to win both events in the same year was Buveur d'Air in 2017.

The 2010 running was named in memory of Dick Francis (1920–2010), a former jockey who was closely associated with Aintree. He famously rode Devon Loch in the Grand National, and he was leading the race on the run-in when the horse jumped and was overtaken. Since 2017 the race has been sponsored by Betway.

Records
Most successful horse (4 wins):
 Morley Street – 1990, 1991, 1992, 1993

Leading jockey (5 wins):
 Ruby Walsh – Ilnamar (2002), Sacundai (2003), Asian Maze (2006), Zarkandar (2013), Annie Power (2016)

Leading trainer (5 wins):
 Toby Balding – Beech Road (1989), Morley Street (1990, 1991, 1992, 1993)
 Nicky Henderson - Oscar Whisky (2011,2012), Buveur d'Air (2017), L'Ami Serge (2018), Epatante (2022)

Winners

See also
 Horse racing in Great Britain
 List of British National Hunt races

References

 Racing Post:

 aintree.co.uk – 2010 John Smith's Grand National Media Guide.
 pedigreequery.com – Aintree Hurdle – Aintree.

External links
 Race Recordings (1982–2003) 

National Hunt races in Great Britain
Aintree Racecourse
National Hunt hurdle races
Recurring sporting events established in 1976
1976 establishments in England